Greater Boston, primarily Boston and Cambridge, is home to more than 1,000 biotechnology companies, ranging from small start-ups to billion-dollar pharmaceutical companies. The many universities in the area give the region a large network of scientists.

The Kendall Square area of Boston holds a large concentration of the life science industry, numbering over 120 companies within a mile, and has been described as the "center of the nation’s biotechnology industry". Boston Area is the most important Biotech region worldwide with 15,9% of corporate values in 2021. The Longwood area is about two miles from Kendall Square, and is also home to many biomedical research companies.

History 
The biotechnology industry in Boston dates back to the 1970s, when genetic engineering was developing. Biogen was the first company in Boston focused on biotechnology.

In 2008, the governor of Massachusetts announced the Massachusetts Life Sciences Act, promising $1 billion to further the development of the biotech industry. Massachusetts is among the top states for biotech jobs.

In 2016, venture investment in Massachusetts biopharma companies was $2.9 billion, and more than half of the biotech companies in the state receiving venture capital were located in Cambridge. When Cambridge and Boston were considered together, they received more than 80% of the funding in the state. Seven teaching hospitals are located in Boston, contributing to the research efforts. Five of the top six NIH-funded independent hospitals in the United States are located in Boston.

Local industry

Academic institutes 
 Broad Institute
 Whitehead Institute for Biomedical Research
 Wyss Institute for Biologically Inspired Engineering
Mass General Research Institute

Biotechnology companies 

 Abcam
 Addgene
 Biogen
 Boston Scientific
 Conagen
 Foundation Medicine
 Genzyme
 ImmunoGen
 Intarcia Therapeutics
 Moderna Therapeutics
 NovoBiotic Pharmaceuticals
 pSivida
 Sage Therapeutics
 Thrombolytic Science International
 Thermo Fisher Scientific
 Vaxess Technologies

Pharmaceutical companies 

 Merck & Co.
 Acceleron Pharma
 Akebia Therapeutics
 Aderis Pharmaceuticals
 Agios Pharmaceuticals
 Alkermes
 Alnylam Pharmaceuticals
 Amgen
 Alzheon
  Deciphera Pharmaceuticals
 Editas Medicine
 Intellia Therapeutics
 Ipsen
 Ironwood Pharmaceuticals
 Merrimack Pharmaceuticals
 Novartis
 Pfizer
 Sanofi
 Sarepta Therapeutics
 Takeda Pharmaceuticals
 Ultragenyx
 Vertex Pharmaceuticals

Other related companies 
 Atlas Venture
 Cytel
 Fast Track Initiative
 IDDI
 LabCentral
 Massachusetts Biotechnology Council (MassBio)

See also 
 List of biotech and pharmaceutical companies in the New York metropolitan area

References 

Biotechnology companies of the United States
Boston-related lists
Pharmaceutical companies of the United States